Pärnu Central Library is a library in Pärnu, Estonia.

The building was designed by the architectural bureau 3+1 Arhitektid. In 2008, the 3+1 Arhitektid was awarded by annual architectural prize of the Cultural Endowment of Estonia for designing the building.

The library was opened in 1909 as a library room. In 1920, the library got its own building.

Directors
 1920-1923  Mart Lekstein (Mart Lepaste)
 1923-1945 Johannes Saar
 1945-1954 Dagmar Bell 
 1954-1986 Ilme Kallasmaa
 1986-2012 Saima-Õie Andla
 since 2012 Heinike Sinijärv.

References

External links
 

Buildings and structures in Pärnu
Libraries in Estonia
Libraries established in 1909